Esten Gjelten   (born 27 September 1942)  is a former Norwegian biathlete.

He participated on the Norwegian team that received silver medals in the 4 × 7.5 km relay in the Biathlon World Championships in 1969, 1970 and 1973.

References

1942 births
Living people
Norwegian male biathletes
Biathlon World Championships medalists